Menconico is a comune (municipality) in the Province of Pavia in the Italian region Lombardy, located about 70 km south of Milan and about 45 km south of Pavia. As of 31 December 2004, it had a population of 465 and an area of 28.2 km².

Menconico borders the following municipalities: Bobbio, Romagnese, Santa Margherita di Staffora, Varzi, Zavattarello.

Demographic evolution

References

Cities and towns in Lombardy